Bayram Badani (also Romanized as Bāyrām Badanī; also known as Bāyrām Badan) is a village in Arshaq Sharqi Rural District, in the Central District of Ardabil County, Ardabil Province, Iran. At the 2006 census, its population was 103, in 21 families.

References 

Towns and villages in Ardabil County